Lahore Wildlife Park  may refer to:

Lahore Zoo Safari, Lahore
also called Woodland Wildlife Park
formerly called Lahore Wildlife Park
Changa Manga, Lahore
Jallo Wildlife Park, Lahore